Mystery was the seventh studio album released by RAH Band, released in 1985. The album hit #60 on the UK Albums Chart making it the only time that the band has ever hit the chart.

Track listing
Mystery includes the following tracks.

Personnel
Richard Anthony Hewson - guitar, keyboards, synthesizer
The Mat Roule Horns - brass
Tiya Nohnyen - drums
Liz Hewson - lead vocals
The Rah La Las - backing vocals
Pete King - saxophone
Peter Boita - synthesizer (for "Clouds Across the Moon" and "Night Wind")
Irvine Arditti - strings
Daniel Hewson Jr. - wind chimes

Charts

Reception
Billboard described the album as a "quirky pop" work with a "distinctly English flavor". Meanwhile, Fred Dollar of Hi-Fi News & Record Review liked the album's blend of disco and jazz, but didn't recommend the album for others to listen to. Mark Ellen of Smash Hits gave the album an 8 out of 10, with special praise for the album's percussion sounds.

References

1985 albums
RCA Records albums
Jazz-funk albums
Synth-pop albums by English artists